Coptotriche longiciliatella is a moth of the  family Tischeriidae. It is found on the Canary Islands.

The wingspan is about 7 mm.

The larvae feed on Rubus ulmifolius. They mine the leaves of their host plant. The mine has the form of an elongated upper-surface blotch. Pupation takes place within the mine. Larvae can be found from autumn to April.

References

Moths described in 1896
Tischeriidae